Cecidipta excoecariae is a species of snout moth in the genus Cecidipta. It was described by Carl Berg in 1877.

Distribution
It is found in South America, including Bolivia and Argentina.

References

Moths described in 1877
Epipaschiinae